Viktor Talyanov (19 October 1934 – 2 January 2014) was a Soviet alpine skier. He competed at the 1956 Winter Olympics and the 1964 Winter Olympics.

References

1934 births
2014 deaths
Soviet male alpine skiers
Olympic alpine skiers of the Soviet Union
Alpine skiers at the 1956 Winter Olympics
Alpine skiers at the 1964 Winter Olympics
Sportspeople from Saint Petersburg